Taojin may refer to:

 Taojin station, Yuexiu District, Guangzhou, Guandong, China; on Line 5 of the Guangzhou Metro
 Taojin Village, Longtang, Anhua, Yiyang, Hunan, China
 Taojin Village, Guzhang County, Xiangxi Prefecture, Hunan Province, China; see Waxiang Chinese

See also

 Tao Jin (disambiguation)
 Tao (disambiguation)
 Jin (disambiguation)
 
 Jintao (given name)